Martha Grey, Countess of Stamford (c. 1838 – 21 August 1916) was born Martha Solomons in Cape Town, South Africa.  She was the daughter of a freed slave named Rebecca and a man from Wellington named Solomon.  Her mother Rebecca was a well known character at the Cape, sometimes referred to as "Queen Rebecca", since she claimed to be related to the British royal family; less is known about her father.

In 1864, she met the Reverend Harry Grey, a clergyman from Cheshire in England and a third cousin of the 7th Earl of Stamford. Harry Grey was sent to the Cape as a remittance man, paid to stay abroad, as a result of habits his family thought dishonourable.  In 1880, Harry and Martha were married; they lived in Wynberg, Cape Town.  Martha bore Harry three children: John, Frances and Mary Grey.  The first two were born before their marriage, while Mary was born thereafter. Upon the death of the 7th Earl, the Earldom of Stamford passed to Harry Grey, and Martha became Countess of Stamford.

Harry Grey, 8th Earl of Stamford, died in 1890, leaving Martha well off financially, though she and her children suffered much racial prejudices and snobbery from the English settlers in Cape Town.  Inspired by her mother's wish for educating her local community, she funded a school in Wynberg, Battswood School, which later became the Battswood Training College for teachers. 
Martha, Dowager Countess of Stamford, died in 1916, and was buried alongside her husband and her daughter Frances in Wynberg.

References

External links
 Karen Williams, "Martha Solomons: The slave’s daughter and Countess of Stamford who made my life possible", Media Diversified, 31 August 2016.
 "THE BLACK COUNTESS FROM BAIN STREET (Never Kissed by the Queen)", blackcountessmartha.

1838 births
1916 deaths
19th-century South African women
19th-century South African women‎
Black British people
English people of South African descent
People from Cape Town
Stamford